Úlfljótsvatn may refer to 
Lake Úlfljótsvatn
Úlfljótsvatn Scout Center